Tatosoma is a genus of moths in the family Geometridae first described by Arthur Gardiner Butler in 1874. The species in this genus are found only in New Zealand.

Species
Species include:

References

Geometridae
Taxa named by Arthur Gardiner Butler
Endemic fauna of New Zealand
Endemic moths of New Zealand